Freizeitpark Widau is a football stadium in Ruggell, Liechtenstein. It is the home ground of FC Ruggell and has a capacity of 500.

References

See also
 List of football stadiums in Liechtenstein

Football venues in Liechtenstein